The PNR 8000 class (also known as the INKA DMUs together with PNR 8100 class) is a diesel multiple unit (DMU) train operated by the Philippine National Railways (PNR) since 2019.

Purchase
PNR signed a contract worth  (US$9.7 million) with the Indonesian firm PT INKA on January 22, 2018, for the purchase of two sets of 3-car DMUs as part of the Reliability and Availability Program. The project was funded from the budget of the then-Department of Transportation and Communications (DOTC) as allocated in the 2015 General Appropriations Act. In 2018, PNR received a budget through the 2018 General Appropriations Act for the purchase of trains.

Design and features
The trains were manufactured by the Indonesian firm Industri Kereta Api, also known as INKA. The 8000 and 8100 DMUs and the 8300 class coaches are all given the designation K3 during their test runs in Indonesia.

Car body
The design of the 8000 class was based from PT Kereta Api's existing EA203 series electric multiple units (EMUs), Minangkabau Express, Adi Soemarmo International Airport Railink, Yogyakarta International Airport Railink & Solo Express diesel electric multiple units (DEMU), but the number of doors were increased from two to three double-leaf sliding doors per side.

The livery consists of a white body with a black design in the windows and blue stripes underneath it. The driver cabs, on the other hand, have a black and orange design with the PNR logo underneath the windshield.

Interior
The trains are the first in the entire PNR system to feature an LED passenger information system display in each train car. Seats are colored orange and longitudinal-type.

The design capacity of a three-car trainset is 750 passengers.

Operations
The INKA DMUs were inaugurated at Dela Rosa station on December 16, 2019, together with PNR and the Department of Transportation officials. It entered revenue service on the same day.

From December 16, 2019, to January 14, 2020, PNR offered free rides on these trainsets between Tutuban and FTI and vice versa, but with 20-passenger limit per station only. Initially, the trainsets were planned to reach Alabang station, but was delayed due to track obstruction and security problems. A trial run to the Alabang station performed by an 8000 class train was conducted on March 1, 2020, followed by passenger trial runs later that month.

From December 2019 to March 2020, the trains serviced the Metro South Commuter line from Tutuban to FTI stations and vice versa, and since June 1, 2020, the trains now service the Metro North Commuter line from Governor Pascual to Bicutan stations and vice versa. While running from Governor Pascual to Bicutan, the LED screen displays the train going to  instead of Bicutan. Occasionally, the trains service the Metro South Commuter line when the Hyundai Rotem DMUs occupy the MNC services.

Incidents and accidents
After the inauguration of the 8000 class, multiple stoning incidents were recorded in December 2019. The old trains were involved at the incidents such as the PNR Hyundai Rotem DMU, 203 series, and the KiHa 35. The 8000 class were also involved at the stoning incident. The cause of the incidents were from a group of minors that throw stones and sometimes used a slingshot.

14 stoning incidents were reported from December 2 to 21, 2019, including a stoning incident in one 8000 class train.
On December 28, 2019, an 8000 class was obstructed between España and Sta. Mesa stations.

Gallery

Notes

References

Philippine National Railways
Rolling stock of the Philippines
Train-related introductions in 2019